{{DISPLAYTITLE:C18H17ClN2O2}}
The molecular formula C18H17ClN2O2 (molar mass: 328.793 g/mol, exact mass: 328.0979 u) may refer to:

 Girisopam
 Oxazolam

Molecular formulas